Michal Filla (born 11 October 1981) is a Czech motorcycle racer.

Career statistics

Grand Prix motorcycle racing

By season

Races by year
(key)

Supersport World Championship

Races by year
(key)

External links
 Profile on MotoGP.com
 Profile on WorldSBK.com

1981 births
Living people
Czech motorcycle racers
250cc World Championship riders
Supersport World Championship riders
Sportspeople from Brno